Tenamaxtlán is a municipio (municipality) and town in the Sierra de Amula Region in the state of Jalisco, Mexico.

Tenamaxtlán was founded in 1538. The current mayor of the town is Mtro. José Manuel Cárdenas Castillo.

Toponymy 
Its name has been interpreted by some people or authors as "Place where the Stoves Abound", although others claim that it means "Place of Tenamaxtles" or "Stone of Stoves". Tenamaxtle comes from the Spanish word tenamaste meaning any of the three stones traditionally used to elevate a comal above a fire in Mesoamerican cultures.

References

External links 

 Tenamaxtlán, Jalisco Official Government Website
 Tenamaxtlán - Jalisco Gobierno del Estado Official Website
 Tenamaxtlán - Towns of Mexico - Pueblos America Website

Municipalities of Jalisco